David Marriner is an Australian property developer and former theatre owner.

A controversial figure in his business dealings, Marriner is credited with revitalising Melbourne's East End theatre district in the 1980s and 1990s through renovating the then-derelict Princess and Regent theatres, and also owning the Forum and Comedy theatres.

References 

Australian theatre owners
Year of birth missing (living people)
Living people